Pop Mennonite was a Mennonite-themed art exhibit created by Don Swartzentruber with the support of the National Endowment and Indiana Arts Commission. The collection included oil paintings, drawings, artists’ books, and music. The Mennonites are members of a Protestant denomination which dates back to the Reformation and advocates a life of modesty and simplicity.

In this art exhibit Swartzentruber addresses pacifism, missions, courtship, adornment, work ethic, and many other issues that held to be important to this religious group. The artist grew up in a Mennonite home and community and pulled thematic material from his own childhood. He uses Mennonite culture as a theme in contemporary visual art. An audio project accompanied the exhibits at Bluffton University and Goshen College and included Mennonite music.

The exhibit provoked strong disapproval from Mennonite bloggers viewing the images online

References

2005 works
Mennonites
Mennonite artists
Mennonitism in the United States